The Teardrops were an English punk/new wave band formed in Manchester, England, in 1978. The founders and always the core of this band were Trevor Wain, John Key and Jimmy Donnelly with various good friends from the Prestwich music scene:- Buzzcocks bassist Steve Garvey, members of The Fall; Martin Bramah, Karl Burns and Tony Friel and former member of V2 Ian Nance, as well as occasional contributions from Dave Brisbane, Helen Harbrook, Dave Price and Rick Goldstraw.

History
Initially, the band line up was, (as pictured) Steve Garvey then in Buzzcocks, Martin Bramah who was in The Fall at that time, Trevor Wain,  Jimmy Donnelly,  John Key and Karl Burns who, at that time, was also in The Fall. It was this line-up with the addition of Dave Brisbane that recorded (at Cargo Studios) and released their debut EP, In And Out Of Fashion. Because of contractual difficulties with The Fall the band were never able to credit Martin Bramah or Karl Burns on the record sleeve.

Due to the communal nature of the band it was not always clear who, apart Trevor Wain, Jimmy Donnelly and John Key were in the band at anyone time.  By the end of 1978 Steve Garvey was committed to his work in Buzzcocks. Martin Bramah in 1979 had left The Fall to form Blue Orchids with Una Baines.  Karl Burns also left The Fall and continued to make a strong contribution to the band. Tony Friel who had left The Fall before they recorded to form The Passage with Dick Witts helped out on some tracks. Most of the recordings at this period varied between Cargo Studios in Rochdale with John Brierly, Smile Studios and Arrow Studios in Manchester. When Graveyard Studios opened in Prestwich all subsequent recordings were done there. The Teardrops along with all their associated bands recorded there as well as a lot of other Manchester bands including Joy Division and A Certain Ratio.

By the end of 1980, The Teardrops stopped recording.

In 2010 a further set of tapes from the Graveyard Studio sessions were rediscovered and restored by Blind Eye Records. This format of the group contained the stalwarts Trevor Wain, Jimmy Donnelly and  John Key  along with Ian Nance. The recordings contain contributions from Steve Garvey, Martin Bramah and Karl Burns. Blind Eye Records are planning to release a series of 7" vinyls in late 2010 into early 2011.

They undertook gigs at The Russell Club (Factory Nights) in Hulme and Eric's in Liverpool with Private Sector, Fast Cars and V2.

Discography
 In and Out of Fashion EP (1978)
 Leave Me No Choice EP (1978)
 "Seeing Double" single (TJM, July 1979)
 Final Vinyl album (Illuminated, January 1980)

Compilation appearances
 Identity Parade (1980)
 White Dopes on Punk - 50 Punk Nuggets & New Wave Rarities (double-disc) (Castle, 2005)

References

External links
 Rate your music - Teardrops
 Members.fortunecity.com

Musical groups from Manchester
English new wave musical groups
English punk rock groups